is a district located in Ishikari Subprefecture, Hokkaido, Japan.

As of 2004, the district has an estimated population of 24,020 and a density of 47.95 persons per km2. The total area is 500.95 km2.

Towns and villages
Shinshinotsu
Tōbetsu

History
1902 Ishikari Town, Hanakawa village and tobetsu village was founded.
1906 Shinotsu Village (篠津村) merges with Ebetsu Village (江別村) in the former Sapporo District, thus leaving the district.  It is now the Shinotsu section of Ebetsu City.
1907 Ishikari Town and Hanakawa village were merged to form new Ishikari Town.
1915 Shinshinotsu village was founded.
1947 Tōbetsu village became Tōbetsu town.
1996 Ishikari Town becomes Ishikari City, leaving the district.

Districts in Hokkaido